Martin Pribula (born 29 November 1985) is a Slovak football player who currently plays for 1. FC Tatran Prešov. Besides Slovakia, he has played in the Czech Republic and Poland.

References

External links
 
 MKS Limanovia profile 
 

1985 births
Living people
Slovak footballers
Association football midfielders
1. FC Tatran Prešov players
Slovak Super Liga players
MŠK Rimavská Sobota players
FC ViOn Zlaté Moravce players
FK Frýdek-Místek players
Limanovia Limanowa players
Zagłębie Sosnowiec players
FK Železiarne Podbrezová players
Expatriate footballers in the Czech Republic
Expatriate footballers in Poland
Slovak expatriate sportspeople in Poland
Sportspeople from Prešov
Slovak expatriate footballers
Slovak expatriate sportspeople in the Czech Republic